The districts of Naples are the sectors that, within the city, are identified by particular geographical and topographical, functional and historical features.

Background 
Through pragmatic sanction issued on 6 January 1779, King Ferdinand IV ordered that the city of Naples be divided into 12 quarters in order to establish and have each of them a judge of the Grand Criminal Court, in order to favor the public safety of the citizens. The 12 districts of the 1779 city division had the following denomination:
 Quartiere di San Ferdinando
 Quartiere di Santa Maria della Vittoria
 Quartiere di Monte Calvario
 Quartiere di San Giuseppe
 Quartiere di San Giovanni Maggiore
 Quartiere di Portanova
 Quartiere di San Lorenzo
 Quartiere dell'Avvocata
 Quartiere della Stella
 Quartiere di San Carlo all'Arena
 Quartiere della Vicaria
 Quartiere del Carmine Maggiore

Over time the neighborhoods have become 30, and although they no longer have any administrative function they continue to be used in everyday language as geographical references. With the resolutions of the municipal council No. 13 of February 10, 2005, No. 15 of February 11, No. 21 of February 16, No. 29 of March 1 and No. 68 of March 21, the city of Naples is divided into 10 municipality. Previously the municipality was divided into 21 circoscrizioni, consisting of 30 city districts.

Subdivisions

Other toponyms 
Below is a list of unofficial toponyms (some have been in the past, for example in the law on rehabilitation) relating to areas of Naples known to have not administrative value. Often they are relative districts or small villages once outside the city and subsequently incorporated into the urban fabric.

A
 Agnano
 Arenaccia
B
 Belvedere
 Borgo dei Vergini
 Borgoloreto
 Borgo Marinari
 Borgo Orefici
 Borgo Santa Lucia
 Borgo Sant'Antonio Abate
C
 Camaldoli e Camaldolilli
 Capodichino
 Capodimonte
 Cariati
 Case Nuove
 Cavalleggeri d'Aosta
 Cavone
 Centro direzionale
 Centro Storico di Napoli
 Colli Aminei
 Coroglio
D
 Doganella
 Duchesca
F
 Forcella
 Foria
 Frullone
G
 Gianturco
 Guantai
 Guantai nuovi
 La Gaiola
M
 Marechiaro
 Materdei
 Megaride
 Mergellina
 Miradois
 Monte di Dio
 Monte Echia
 Montesanto
 Mostra d'Oltremare
N
 Nazaret
 Nisida
 Nuova Shenzou
O
 Orsolone
P
 Pallonetto di Santa Chiara
 Pallonetto di San Liborio
 Pallonetto di Santa Lucia
 Pasconcello
 Petraio
 Piedigrotta
 Pignasecca
 Pisani
 Pizzofalcone
 Ponti Rossi
Q
 Quartieri Spagnoli
 Quattro palazzi

R
 Rione Alto
 Rione Amedeo
 Rione Amicizia
 Rione Antignano
 Rione Ascarelli
 Rione Carità
 Rione De Gasperi
 Rione Flegreo
 Rione La Loggetta
 Rione Luzzatti
 Rione Sanità
 Rione Sant'Alfonso
 Rione Santa Rosa
 Rione Traiano
 Rione Villa
S
 San Rocco
 Sant'Eframo e Sant'Eframo vecchio
 Sant'Erasmo
 Spinelli
T
 Tarsia
 Toledo
 Torretta
 Torricelli
V
 Vasto
 Ventaglieri
 Vicarìa vecchia
 Vigliena
Z
 Zona ospedaliera

References

Bibliography

External links 
 

 
Subdivisions of Naples
.
Geography of the Metropolitan City of Naples